A che servono questi quattrini? (i.e. "What good are this money?") is a 1942 Italian comedy film  directed  by Esodo Pratelli and starring Eduardo and Peppino De Filippo. It is an adaptation of a play with the same name by Armando Curcio that two years earlier the De Filippo brothers had played on stage with massive success and critical acclaim.

Cast 
 
Eduardo De Filippo as Marquis Eduardo Parascandolo  
 Peppino De Filippo as  Vincenzino Esposito
 Clelia Matania as Rachelina 
 Paolo Stoppa as  Marchitiello 
 Nerio Bernardi as  Michele 
  as  Ferdinando De Rosa  
 Edwige Maul as  Lilli
  as  Carmela
 Nino Marchesini as  Mattia 
  Margherita Pezzullo as  Luisa 
 Nino Vingelli as  Fruit Vendor
 Adelina Carloni as Miss De Rosa
   as Carlo Palmieri 
 Enzo Petito as  Notary

References

External links

Italian comedy films
1942 comedy films
1942 films
Italian films based on plays
Italian black-and-white films
1940s Italian-language films
1940s Italian films